The Stunt Girl is a 1947 American short documentary film produced by Jerry Fairbanks and directed by Robert Carlisle. It recaps the career to date of Hollywood stuntwoman Lila Finn, who began working as a stunt double ten years earlier in the film The Hurricane. It includes Finn's performance of a stair fall especially for the film. The film was aired as part of the 1947 Paramount Pictures documentary series, Unusual Occupations.

Production
The Stunt Girl is a short documentary film focusing on the career to date of Hollywood stuntwoman Lila Finn, who made her first appearance in The Hurricane (1937) as a stunt double for Dorothy Lamour. The film was produced by Jerry Fairbanks and directed by Robert Carlisle.

Finn was asked to demonstrate a stair fall in the film. She fell down a "long circular staircase eleven times" to satisfy the director.

The short film was aired as part of the 1947 Paramount Pictures documentary series, Unusual Occupations.

References

Sources

External links

American short documentary films
1947 documentary films
1947 films
1940s American films